A Time to Kill is a 1996 American legal drama film. It is based on John Grisham's 1989 novel of the same name. Sandra Bullock, Samuel L. Jackson, Matthew McConaughey, and Kevin Spacey star with Donald and Kiefer Sutherland appearing in supporting roles. The film received mixed to positive reviews and was a commercial success, making $152 million at the worldwide box office. It is the second of two films based on Grisham's novels directed by Joel Schumacher, with the other being The Client released two years prior.

Plot
In Canton, Mississippi, ten-year-old African American girl Tonya Hailey is abducted, raped, and beaten by two local white men, Billy Ray Cobb and James Willard, while on her way home getting groceries. The duo dump her in a nearby river after a failed attempt to hang her. Tonya survives, and the two men are arrested by Sheriff Ozzie Walls.

Tonya's father, Carl Lee Hailey, contacts Jake Brigance, a white lawyer who previously defended his brother Lester. Brigance admits the possibility that the rapists will walk free. Carl Lee goes to the county courthouse and opens fire with an automatic rifle, killing both rapists and unintentionally wounding Deputy Dwayne Looney, whose leg is later amputated. Carl Lee is arrested and Brigance agrees to defend him.

As the rape and subsequent revenge killing gain national media attention, district attorney Rufus Buckley decides to take the case in hopes of furthering his political career. He seeks the death penalty, and presiding Judge Omar Noose denies Brigance a change of venue to a more ethnically diverse county, meaning that Carl Lee will have an all-White jury. Brigance seeks help from his defense team: law student Ellen Roark, close friend Harry Rex Vonner, and former mentor and longtime activist Lucien Wilbanks, a once-great civil rights lawyer. Meanwhile, Billy Ray's brother, Freddie Lee Cobb, plans to avenge his brother's death by joining and enlisting the help of the Mississippi branch of the Ku Klux Klan and its Grand Dragon, Stump Sisson, to ensure Carl Lee's conviction and death sentence by any means necessary.

On the first day of the trial, the Klan takes to the streets and rallies, only to be outnumbered by counter-protesters consisting of the area's minority residents and whites who support Carl Lee. The protest erupts into a violent brawl that results in dozens of injuries and the death of Stump Sisson. The Klan also begins to target Brigance, assaulting his elderly secretary and her husband, who dies of a heart attack brought on by the assault. They also burn a cross on his lawn and threaten his wife and daughter. When Brigance refuses to back down, the Klan then increases their attacks, including burning Brigance's house. Soon after Cobb kidnaps and assaults Roark. 

Brigance is able to discredit the state's psychiatrist, Dr. Wilbert Rodeheaver. However, Buckley in turn discredits Brigance's psychiatrist, Dr. Willard Tyrell Bass, by revealing his prior conviction of statutory rape. Dispirited, Brigance tells Carl Lee that there is little hope for an acquittal. Carl Lee replies that he had chosen Brigance as an attorney because he is a white man and has insight into how the jury sees Carl Lee. During closing arguments, a deeply-shaken Brigance tells the jury to close their eyes and listen to a story. He describes, in slow and painful detail, the entire ordeal of Tonya, in which some of the jurors shed tears. Brigance then asks the jury, in his final comment, to "now imagine she's white."

After deliberation, a black child runs out of the courthouse and screams, "He's innocent!" Jubilation ensues amongst the supporters while the Klan becomes enraged over their defeat. Meanwhile, Sheriff Walls arrests Freddie Lee for his crimes, as well as a corrupt deputy who is also revealed to be a Klan member.

Sometime later, Brigance brings his wife and daughter to a family cookout at Carl Lee's house to celebrate his freedom, challenging Carl Lee's previous statement that their children would "never play together".

Cast

 Samuel L. Jackson as Carl Lee Hailey
 Sandra Bullock as Ellen Roark
 Matthew McConaughey as Jake Brigance
 Kevin Spacey as Rufus Buckley
 Oliver Platt as Harry Rex Vonner
 Charles S. Dutton as Sheriff Ozzie Walls
 Brenda Fricker as Ethel Twitty
 Donald Sutherland as Lucien Wilbanks
 Beth Grant as Cora Mae Cobb
 Kiefer Sutherland as Freddie Lee Cobb
 Patrick McGoohan as Judge Omar Noose
 Ashley Judd as Carla Brigance
 Tonea Stewart as Gwen Hailey
 Rae'Ven Larrymore Kelly as Tonya Hailey
 John Diehl as Tim Nunley
 Chris Cooper as Deputy Sheriff Dwayne Looney
 Nicky Katt as Billy Ray Cobb
 Doug Hutchison as James Louis "Pete" Willard
 Kurtwood Smith as Stump Sisson
 Anthony Heald as Dr. Wilbert Rodeheaver
 M. Emmet Walsh as Dr. Willard Tyrell Bass
 Joe Seneca as Reverend Isaiah Street
 Jonathan Hadary as Norman Reinfield
 David U. Hodges as Bailiff
 Randall Ponder as Courtroom Section Leader

Production
The film was mainly produced in and around Canton, Mississippi, using a soundstage built specifically for the production in the city's industrial park. Most location filming took place around the Madison County Courthouse and former county jail on the courthouse grounds. Other location filming took place in the Jackson, Mississippi, metro area, including the Jackson-Evers International Airport and Hinds County Medical Center (now Merit Health Central).

Grisham had apparently not wanted to sell the film rights to the book. He sold the rights for a record $6 million. He received casting approval for the film and overruled the director's choice of Woody Harrelson as the lead role, which was based on Grisham himself. Val Kilmer was also an early contender for the role. Sandra Bullock also received $6 million for five weeks of work.

Reception

Box office
A Time to Kill was released in the U.S. on July 24, 1996. It reached number one during its first two weeks and grossed over $108 million domestically.

Critical reception
On Rotten Tomatoes, the film has an approval rating of 67% based on 58 reviews, with an average rating of 6.2/10. The critics' consensus reads: "Overlong and superficial, A Time to Kill nonetheless succeeds on the strength of its skillful craftsmanship and top-notch performances". It has a score of 54 out of 100 on Metacritic, based on 21 reviews. Audiences surveyed by CinemaScore gave the film a grade of "A" on a scale of A+ to F.

Roger Ebert gave the film three stars out of four, saying: "I was absorbed by A Time to Kill, and found the performances strong and convincing," and added that "this is the best of the film versions of Grisham novels, I think, and it has been directed with skill by Joel Schumacher."

The film was not without its detractors. Anthony Puccinelli gave the film one star, calling it "worthless" and remarking: "A Time to Kill argues for vigilantism but disguises its message by making the vigilante black, allowing viewers to think their blood lust and thirst for revenge is actually empathy for the oppressed." Peter Travers felt that "they [Schumacher and screenwriter Akiva Goldsman] cram[med] in too much," adding, "This distracts from the heart of the picture, which is in the bond between Carl Lee (the brilliant [Samuel L.] Jackson is quietly devastating) and Jake, a husband and father who knows he, too, would have shot anyone who raped his little girl." Gene Siskel remarked it was "An overwrought, contrived courtroom thriller", "cornball" and concluded "This story has been recycled out of countless better movies."

Grisham enjoyed the film, remarking: "When all was said and done I was happy with it, happy we were able to find a kid like Matthew McConaughey. It wasn't a great movie, but it was a good one."

Reaction in France
In France, the film has been the subject of controversy. Critics have accused the movie of making an apology for the death penalty and right of self-defense. A question mark was added at the end of the title ("Le Droit de tuer ?"/"The Right to Kill ?") so as not to shock the audience. Amnesty International France uses the word "disturbing" when referring to the film in one of its documents. Les Inrockuptibles described the film as "nauseating", "stinking", almost "fascist", with an "ultra-populist" script that makes one want to "vomit". Libération criticized the script, calling it "extremely dirty": the movie, says the newspaper, "militates in favour of the Black cause only to legitimize, after many plot buckles (resurrection of the Ku Klux Klan, the deceits of court, threats of many kinds) the mentally ill gesture of the avenging father". According to Libération, the movie "justifies the indefensible" with a "dripping sentimentalism".

Accolades
 Golden Globe – Best Supporting Actor – Samuel L. Jackson – Nominated
 NAACP Image Award – Outstanding Motion Picture – Won
 NAACP Image Award – Best Supporting Actor in a film – Samuel L. Jackson – Nominated
 Blockbuster Entertainment Award – Favorite Actress – Suspense – Sandra Bullock – Won
 MTV Movie Awards – Best Female Performance – Sandra Bullock – Nominated
 MTV Movie Awards – Best Breakthrough Performance – Matthew McConaughey – Won
 Razzie Award – Worst Written Film Grossing Over $100 Million – Akiva Goldsman – Nominated

Soundtrack

Elliot Goldenthal scored the film. AllMusic gave the soundtrack two and a half stars out of five, commenting that it "doesn't work particularly well when it's separated from the film itself."

 "Defile and Lament" – 2:33
 "Consolation" – 2:23
 "Justice Wheel" – 0:46
 "Pavane for Solace" – 2:29
 "Abduction" – 2:58
 "An Asurrendering" – 1:35
 "Pavane for Loss" – 1:07
 "Take My Hand, Precious Lord" / "Retribution" by The Jones Sisters – 6:50
 "Torch and Hood" – 2:02
 "Pressing Judgement" – 1:29
 "White Sheet" – 2:38
 "Pavane for Solace" (piano solo) – 2:06
 "Verdict Fanfare" (For Aaron) – 4:03
 "Take My Hand, Precious Lord" by Cissy Houston – 4:03

Credits
 Music composed by Elliot Goldenthal (except 8 and 14)
 Music produced by Matthias Gohl
 Orchestrated by Robert Elhai and Elliot Goldenthal
 Conducted by Jonathan Sheffer
 Recorded and mixed by Joel Iwataki
 Electronic music produced by Richard Martinez
 Additional orchestrations by Deniz Hughes

See also
 Jury nullification
 Vigilante film
 Trial movies
 The Act of Killing

References

External links

 
 
 
 

1996 films
1990s English-language films
1996 crime drama films
1990s legal films
1990s vigilante films
American courtroom films
American crime drama films
American legal drama films
American vigilante films
Films about capital punishment
Films about child sexual abuse
Films about human rights
Films about the Ku Klux Klan
Films about lawyers
Films about rape
Films based on works by John Grisham
Films directed by Joel Schumacher
Films scored by Elliot Goldenthal
Films set in Mississippi
Films shot in Mississippi
Films with screenplays by Akiva Goldsman
Regency Enterprises films
Warner Bros. films
Films produced by Arnon Milchan
1990s American films